The Battle of Alamance, which took place on May 16, 1771, was the final battle of the Regulator Movement, a rebellion in colonial North Carolina over issues of taxation and local control, considered by some to be the opening salvo of the American Revolution.

Background

In the spring of 1771, North Carolina Governor William Tryon left New Bern, mustering and marching approximately 1,000 militia troops westwards to address a rebellion that had been brewing in western counties for several years. It had up to this point included only minor, scattered acts of violence, followed by refusals to pay fees, disruptions of court proceedings, and continued harassment of government officials. 

About 2,000 so-called "regulators" had gathered, hoping to gain concessions from Tryon by intimidating him with a show of superior force. Funded £6,000 by council member and wealthy merchant Samuel Cornell, on May 11, Tryon left the county seat of Hillsborough with his militia to confront the Regulators, who had made camp south of Great Alamance Creek in western Orange County.

Battle
On the evening of May 15, Tryon received word that the Regulators were camped about six miles away. The next morning, at about 8:00 am, Tryon's troops set out to a field about one-half mile from the camp of the Regulators. He formed two lines, and divided his artillery between the wings and the center of the first line. The Regulators remained disorganized, with no leadershipno officer ranked higher than captainand no anticipation of an attack, expecting that their superior numbers would frighten Tryon's militia.

Tryon sent one of his aides-de-camp, Captain Philemon Hawkins II, and the Sheriff of Orange County with a proclamation:

 Alamance Camp, Thursday, May 16, 1771.

To Those Who Style Themselves "Regulators": In reply to your petition of yesterday, I am to acquaint you that I have ever been attentive to the interests of your County and to every individual residing therein. I lament the fatal necessity to which you have now reduced me by withdrawing yourselves from the mercy of the crown and from the laws of your country. To require you who are now assembled as Regulators, to quietly lay down your arms, to surrender up your leaders, to the laws of your country and rest on the leniency of the Government. By accepting these terms within one hour from the delivery of this dispatch, you will prevent an effusion of blood, as you are at this time in a state of rebellion against your King, your country, and your laws.

(Signed) William Tryon.

While the terms were being read, Tryon's troops began to move forward. Shortly after that, Tryon was informed that the Regulators had rejected his terms. Herman Husband, a Quaker, realizing violence was about to take place, left the area.

By midday the hour had expired. Tryon sent one final warning:

Gentlemen and Regulators: Those of you who are not too far committed should desist and quietly return to your homes, those of you who have laid yourselves liable should submit without resistance. I and others promise to obtain for you the best possible terms. The Governor will grant you nothing. You are unprepared for war! You have no cannon! You have no military training! You have no commanding officers to lead you in battle. You have no ammunition. You will be defeated!

Some of the Regulators petitioned Tryon to give up seven captured Regulators in exchange for two of his men that they had captured the previous day. Tryon agreed, but after a half an hour, the captured officers did not appear. He became suspicious that his positions were being flanked and ordered the militia to march within 30 yards of the Regulators. Shortly thereafter, a large crowd of Regulators appeared in front of the militia, waving their hats and daring the militia to open fire. At about this time, two men who had been attempting to negotiate a peace between the two sides left Tryon's camp: Reverend David Caldwell and Robert Thompson. Caldwell made it to the field between the two lines, but was warned by the Regulators, who saw that the Governor was about to open fire. Thompson was detained by Tryon as a prisoner. Tryon, in a moment of anger, took a musket from a militiaman and shot Thompson dead. Realizing what he had done, he sent a flag bearer named Donald Malcolm with a white flag in hopes of calming things quickly. The flag bearer was himself fired upon by the Regulators, who called out, "Fire and be damned".

The Regulators lacked the leadership, organization, and ammunition that Tryon had, but the early course of the battle went well for them. They employed what was referred to as "Indian style" fighting, hiding behind trees and avoiding structure and lines. This allowed two of the Regulators, brothers named McPherson, to capture one of Tryon's three cannons. Unfortunately for them, the Regulators had no ammunition and it could not be used. A man considered one of the principal military leaders of the Regulators, Captain Montgomery, was killed by a shell at about the same time a bullet hit Tryon's hat. The Governor sent a second white flag, but the aide-de-camp was killed while regulator Patrick Muller called for his fellow insurgents to cease fire. Outraged at the disregard of a second white flag, the Governor rallied his troops against the insurgents, whose ammunition was running out. Many of the Regulators fled the field. Delays prevented the 300 reinforcements under Captain Benjamin Merrill from arriving in time. Some of the Regulators remained behind to continue firing upon the militia. Tryon then ordered the woods to be set on fire.

Aftermath

Losses for both sides are disputed. Tryon reported nine dead and 61 wounded among the militia. Other historians indicate much greater numbers, between 15 and 27 killed. Both sides counted nine dead among the Regulators and from dozens to approximately two-hundred wounded. Tryon took 13 prisoners. One of them, James Few, was executed at the camp, and six were executed later in nearby Hillsborough. Many Regulators traveled on to frontier areas beyond North Carolina. Tryon pardoned others and allowed them to stay on the condition that they pledge an oath of allegiance to the royal government. The battle took place in what was then Orange County. During the American Revolution a decade later, the same section of Orange County (subdivided into Alamance County in 1849) saw several minor skirmishes, including the infamous Pyle's Hacking Match in 1781. Recent archaeological studies at the site have shown that the area now known as Alamance Battleground was also the site of another skirmish in the revolutionary war and of a civil war era Confederate encampment.

Order of battle

Provincial militia
According to Tryon's journal, the following men served under his command:
 Major-generals: John Ashe and Thomas Lloyd
 Lieutenant-generals: John Rutherford, Lewis Henry deRosset, John Sampson, Robert Palmer, Benjamin Heron, and Samuel Strudwick
 Majors of brigade: Abner Nash and Robert Howe
 Colonels: Alexander Osborne, Edmund Fanning, Robert Harris, James Sampson, Samuel Spencer, James Moore, and Maurice Moore
 Lieutenant-colonels: John Frohock, Moses Alexander, Alexander Lillington, John Gray, Samuel Benton, and Robert Schaw
 Majors: William Bullock, Walter Lindsay, Thomas Lloyd, Martin Fifer, and John Hinton
 Alexander Lillington and James Moore were both American patriots at the Battle of Moore's Creek Bridge
 Richard Caswell was delegate to the Continental Congress in Philadelphia, one of the principal authors of the 1776 constitution of North Carolina, and the first governor of the newly independent state
 Francis Nash, whose guilt for extortion precipitated the Regulator Movement, fought and died as an American patriot in the Revolution
 Griffith Rutherford served as a brigadier general in Salisbury District Brigade of the North Carolina militia

Regulators
The following individuals were numbered as members of the Regulators:
 Herman Husband
 James Hunter – So-called "General of the Regulators", whose 1901 statue is now found at Alamance Battleground
 James Few – executed at camp after the battle
 Charles Harrington – died from wounds received at the battle 
 Abraham and John Helton 

The following were excepted from pardons by Tryon:
 Samuel Jones
 Joshua Teague
 Samuel Waggoner
 Simon Dunn Jr.
 Abraham Creson
 Benjamin Merrit [Merrill]
 James Wilkerson Sr.
 Edward Smith
 Malachi Fyke
 John Bumpass
 Joseph Boring
 William Rankin
 William Robeson
 John Winkler
 John Wilcox

Six men were found guilty of treason, but were pardoned at Tryon's behest:
 Forest Mercer
 James Stewart
 James Emerson – later signed the Revolutionary War Patriots' Muster Roll as James Emison (Emmerson)
 Hermon (or Harmon) Cox – his powder horn is now on display at Alamance Battleground
 William Brown
 James Copeland

Six men were found guilty of treason and were sentenced to be hanged, drawn and quartered, although in practice, they were only hanged:
 Benjamin Merrill
 Robert Matear (Matter)
 Pugh 
 Captain Robert Messer
 Peter Craven
 One unknown man

Historiography

Some historians in the late nineteenth and early twentieth centuries considered the battle to be a forerunner to the American Revolutionary War, and contemporaneous locals agreed with this assessment.  Yet, this has been questioned by present-day historians arguing that the Regulators (though viewed in the eyes of Tryon and his allies as being in rebellion against King, country, and law) were not intending a complete overthrow of His Majesty's Government in North Carolina.  They were only standing up against those certain local officials who had become corrupt and unworthy tools of the King, and they only turned to riot and armed rebellion as a last resort when all other peaceful means through petitions, elections to the Assembly, etc. had failed to redress their grievances.  Many surviving ex-Regulators became loyalists during the Revolution, and several anti-Regulators [e.g. William Hooper, Alexander Martin, Francis Nash, and Samuel Johnston] became patriots during the Revolution.

Legacy

Visitors to Alamance Battleground State Historic Site may view the field of battle, memorialized in 1880 with a granite monument and a second monument in 1903. Today the site contains exhibits, period cannon, and colored flags representing troop positions. The visitors' center offers exhibits, artifacts, and a presentation on the battle. Visitors may also tour the onsite Allen House, a restored frontier farmstead of the period. The Battle of Alamance is further memorialized through an annual battle reenactment.

The battle features in the Diana Gabaldon novel, The Fiery Cross, and is depicted in the television adaptation, Outlander, in the fifth season's episode "The Ballad of Roger Mac" which first aired in 2020.

See also
 Overmountain Men
 Watauga Association

References

 Breaking Loose Together: The Regulator Rebellion in Pre-Revolutionary North Carolina by Marjoleine Kars.

External links

 
 , dead link

Military history of the Thirteen Colonies
Pre-statehood history of North Carolina
Pre-statehood history of South Carolina
Pre-statehood history of Tennessee
Tax resistance in the United States
1760s in the Thirteen Colonies
1770 in the Thirteen Colonies
1771 in the Thirteen Colonies
Battles in North Carolina
Conflicts in 1770
Conflicts in 1771
Regulator Movement
1771 in North Carolina